George Brown (7 December 1835 – 7 April 1917) was an English Methodist missionary and ethnographer.

Early life and education 

George Brown was born at Barnard Castle, Durham, England, the son of George Brown, barrister, and his wife Elizabeth, née Dixon, sister of the wife of Rev. Thomas Buddle, missionary in New Zealand. Brown was educated at a private school and on leaving, became an assistant in a doctors surgery, was afterwards with a chemist, and then in a draper's shop. Brown reacted to his stepmother's discipline and attempted to run away to sea.

Seagoing life 

Brown, when 16 years old, sailed in a large East Indiaman chartered by the government as a troop-ship. After going to the Mediterranean it went to Quebec. There Brown had an accident and broke his leg, fortunately in his case, as the vessel was lost with all hands on her next voyage. After a short stay in Canada, Brown returned to England but could not settle down.

In March 1855 Brown migrated to New Zealand, among the other passengers being Bishop Selwyn and the Rev. J. C. Patteson, afterwards bishop of Melanesia. He joined Patteson's bible class, but "could not remember receiving any great spiritual benefit at that time". Landing at Auckland he went to Onehunga where he was kindly received by an uncle and aunt, the Rev. Thomas and Mrs Buddle.

Conversion and missionary work 

Under their influence Brown experienced a conversion and became a local preacher. In 1859 he decided to offer himself as a missionary to Fiji, and at the Sydney Methodist conference of 1860 was appointed. On 2 August 1860 he was married to Miss Sarah Lydia Wallis, daughter of the Rev. James Wallis. They left next week for Sydney where Brown was ordained, and going on to Samoa, arrived on 30 October 1860. He lived in Samoa between 1860 and 1874, mostly on the island of Savai'i. He learned the language and wrote about Samoan culture. He was a key figure in the early days of training Samoans for the ministry and the establishment of Piula Theological College on the north coast of Upolu Island in Samoa.
Brown began writing his manuscript journals in Samoa, recording his experience as a missionary in the Pacific.
When Brown began his work most of the natives were already professing Christians, and he immediately set to work building churches and mission houses and attending to the education of the children. He quickly learned the language, and every condition seemed favourable, but there was one disturbing feature. Germany was extending her influence in the islands, and some of her traders far from trying to keep the peace were selling arms and ammunition to the natives. One day war broke out between the natives of an adjoining district and those of his own centre, and Brown immediately hastened to place himself between the contending parties, and sat for the remainder of the day in the sun trying to make a truce between them. In this he was not successful and there was much fighting for some time. Brown, however, became a great figure among the Samoans. His varied experiences as a youth in the doctor's surgery and chemist's shop helped him in the simple doctoring of native ills, and his career as a sailor had taught him many useful things. His mastery of the language was a great asset, and his human charity helped much in all his relations with both the natives and the white beachcombers living on the islands. He left Samoa in 1874 with the intention of being transferred to New Britain and New Ireland, and travelled through Australia appealing for funds. In August 1875 Brown went to the New Britain group of islands and began his work there. In the early days he was constantly in danger of losing his life, as he worked among cannibalistic natives who were constantly fighting among themselves. In 1878 he led a punitive expedition against a cannibal chief responsible for the massacre of Christian native teachers, this caused an uproar in the Australian press and was known as the 'Blanche Bay affair'. However it did improve the situation for Europeans, later Brown's wife could join him. He was there a little more than five years and returned to Sydney in the beginning of 1881.

Deputation and circuit work 

During the next six years Brown was engaged in deputation and circuit work. He also wrote a series of anonymous articles in the Sydney Morning Herald regarding the necessity of British control of the islands of the Pacific. He was thoroughly familiar with German methods, and was convinced that they constituted a menace both to the natives and the world in general. In 1887 he was appointed secretary of the board of missions of the Methodist Church and held this position for many years. In the following year he was appointed a special commissioner to report on the position in Tonga, where there had been serious trouble for some years during the premiership of Shirley Waldemar Baker. He was able to speak the language of the natives and gather evidence for himself. He compiled a comprehensive and valuable series of Reports by the Rev. George Brown, Special Commissioner of the Australasian Wesleyan Methodist General Conference to Tonga, printed at Sydney in 1890. He continued for many years to keep in touch with missionary work in Papua, the Bismarck Archipelago, the Solomons, Samoa, Fiji and Tonga. In the islands in the German sphere of influence he had to walk warily, but his knowledge and experience were of the greatest value not only to his own church but to the British government. He resigned his position of general secretary of missions in 1907, and in the following year brought out his autobiography George Brown, D.D., Pioneer-missionary and Explorer. Unfortunately he had declined an offer by his friend, Robert Louis Stevenson, to write his biography.

Writing 
Ten volumes of Brown's manuscript journals survive. Brown published Melanesians and Polynesians Their Life-histories Described and Compared (1910), a valuable record of the manners, customs and folklore of the islanders written by a man who had spent much of his time among them over a period of 48 years, and who was familiar with the Samoan, Tongan, Fijian and New Britain languages. Brown died at Sydney on 7 April 1917. His wife survived him with two sons and three daughters. Brown was also the author of various pamphlets and articles, and was associated with the Rev. B. Danks in the preparation of a Dictionary of the Duke of York Language New Britain Group.

References

Niel Gunson, 'Brown, George (1835–1917)', Australian Dictionary of Biography, Volume 3, MUP, 1969, pp 256–257.

Reeson, Margaret, Pacific Missionary George Brown 1835–1917. Wesleyan Methodist Church. Canberra: Australian National University E Press 2013. XIII, 351 p.
Brown, George, D.D., An Autobiography: Pioneer-Missionary and Explorer. London: Hodder & Stoughton, 1908.

External links

George Brown, Melanesians and Polynesians, their life-histories described and compared, Published 1910 by Macmillan and co. Ltd., London – Open Library
The George Brown Collection at Minpaku: An introduction to the life and work of George Brown, and his collection of ethnological artefacts, George Brown Project, 2016, (website) National Museum of Ethnology, Osaka. 
Reverend George Brown Papers, 1879-1917, Brown, George, 1835-1917, Parts 1-3. Anthropological notes and queries about the Pacific Islands, mainly Duke of York, New Britain, New Hebrides and the Solomon Islands Parts 4-7. Personal letters, and papers relating to his missionary work as general secretary, State Library of New South Wales, MLMSS952

Reverend George Brown Papers, 1860-1917, Brown, George, 1835-1917, A 1686 / vols. 1-7 Letter-books, 1865-1880, 1886-1890, 1902-1909 A 1686 / vols. 8-17 Journal, 1860-1871, 1874-1880, 1888-1897 A 1686 / vols. 18-24 Correspondence and papers, 1870-1917 A 1686 / vols. 25-26 Samoan stories, proverbs, sayings, by Penisimani; collected and partly translated by Reverend George Brown, 1865-1870 A 1686 / vol. 27 Proverbs, phrases and similes of the Samoans by Reverend George Brown A 1686 / vol. 28 Dictionary of Duke of York Island; with Reverend B. Danks, 1882 A 1686 / vol. 29 Memoranda, words, etc., Duke of York Island by Reverend George Brown, 1882 A 1686 / vol. 30 Savage life in the South Seas, 1875-1879, State Library of New South Wales, Microfilm, 942503 

1835 births
1917 deaths
People from Barnard Castle
English Methodist missionaries
English diarists
Methodist missionaries in Papua New Guinea
Methodist missionaries in Tonga
Methodist missionaries in Samoa
Methodist missionaries in Fiji
Methodist missionaries in the Solomon Islands
British expatriates in Samoa
British expatriates in Tonga
British expatriates in Papua New Guinea
British expatriates in Fiji
British expatriates in the Solomon Islands
English emigrants to New Zealand